Mike Sussman may refer to:

 Mike Sussman (TV series writer/producer) (born 1967), best known for his work on the shows Star Trek:Voyager, Star Trek:Enterprise and Threshold
 Mike Sussman (TV promotions writer/producer), television promotions writer and producer, best known for his promotional spots for The Andy Griffith Show